Arroyo Aguiar is an H chondrite meteorite that fell to earth during the summer of 1950 in the province of Santa Fe, Argentina.

Classification
It is an ordinary chondrite type H with a petrologic type 5, thus belongs to the group H5.

See also 
 Glossary of meteoritics
 Meteorite falls
 Ordinary chondrite

References

Meteorites found in Argentina
1950 in Argentina